Suleiman Antoine Frangieh (born 18 October 1965) is a Lebanese politician. He is the incumbent leader of the Marada Movement and a former Member of Parliament for the Maronite seat of Zgharta-Zawyie, in North Lebanon.

Early life
Suleiman was born in Zgharta, Lebanon on 18 October 1965 to a political family who claim to be the decedents of the Mardaits. He is the son of the late Tony Frangieh, who was assassinated in the Ehden massacre in 1978, and grandson of the former Lebanese President Suleiman Frangieh and as such, carries his grandfather's name. Samir Frangieh was Suleiman's cousin once removed.

Suleiman Frangieh's grandfather brought him to Syria after the Ehden massacre, which was perpetrated by rival Maronite Kataeb Party militia forces. In Syria, Suleiman was taken under the wing of Bassel Assad, eldest son of the Syrian President. His friendship with the Al Assad family has remained close since then.

Political career
Suleiman Frangieh's military career began when he was 17 years old. In 1982, he became leader of the Marada Brigades. The militia later disbanded to become a political group following the Taif Agreement. Marada began to participate in social, cultural, educational, health and political affairs.

He was appointed to Parliament for the first time on 7 June 1991 to fill his late father's seat and was then the youngest MP. He was subsequently elected for three successive terms in 1992, 1996 and 2000. In the 1996 Rafic Hariri cabinet Frangieh served as Minister of Health.

Suleiman Frangieh joined mourners gathered in front of Beirut's city palace to pay his final respects to Rafic Hariri who was killed by a bomb on 14 February 2005. His presence made many uneasy, since it was his ministry that was overseeing the investigation into Hariri's assassination.

During the Lebanese Parliamentary Elections of 7 June 2009, Suleiman Frangieh was elected as a Member of Parliament for the seat of Zgharta-Zawyieh after he had lost that seat in the 2005 elections. He won the seat along with his two running partners Estephan Douwaihi and Salim Bey Karam. Together, these three politicians, along with the addition of MP Emile Rahme, formed the 'Free and Unified Lebanon' bloc in the Lebanese Parliament.

In August 2012, Frangieh commented on the Syrian civil war stating that the pro-Assad coalition would win the war and gave his full support to the Syrian government. Frangieh also added that he opposes the "negative neutrality" which is "pretending to be neutral while arms are smuggled from Lebanon to Syria". He called the "negative neutrality" a "conspiring against Syria".

Frangieh was one of the main contenders for the Lebanese presidential elections of 2004 (which did not occur) and 2016 and is a very likely candidate for the next presidential election expected to occur in 2022.

In addition, the party runs a website called elmarada.org which follows local and international news and keeps the audience updated 24/7.

He did not run for re-election in the 2018 and 2022 General elections. His son, Tony, succeeded him in the Parliament.

Personal life
Suleiman is the father of two children from a first marriage with Marianne Sarkis; Tony (born 1987), who was elected to parliament in 2018 to replace his father, and Bassel (born 1992). Suleiman Frangieh has been married to Rima Karkafi since 2003 who gave birth to his daughter Vera (born 2007). He resides in Bnachii, a small town right next to his hometown of Zgharta. He is a close friend of Syrian President Bashar al-Assad.

References

External links
Sleiman Frangieh Jr. on Ehden Family Tree Website

Living people
1965 births
Members of the Parliament of Lebanon
Government ministers of Lebanon
Marada Movement politicians
Lebanese Maronites
Suleiman Jr.
People from Zgharta
Candidates for President of Lebanon
Children of national leaders of Lebanon